Come and Get These Memories is the debut album by the American girl group Martha and the Vandellas, released in 1963. Put out by Gordy after the success of the trio's hit of the same name, the album also contains the group's debut single, "I'll Have to Let Him Go", which was originally intended for Mary Wells, and "A Love Like Yours (Don't Come Knocking Everyday)". Most of the album was produced by Holland–Dozier–Holland and William "Mickey" Stevenson.

Former member Gloria Williams originally sang lead on the song "There He Is (At My Door)" and Martha Reeves later revealed in her autobiography that the song was re-recorded after Williams left with her on lead vocals. Williams backing vocals on "I'll Have to Let Him Go" is her only album appearance. This album also includes a cover version of "Tears on My Pillow" by Little Anthony and the Imperials, and standards like "Moments to Remember".

Track listing

Personnel
Martha Reeves – lead vocals; backing vocals on "There He Is (At My Door)"
Rosalind Ashford – backing vocals
Annette Beard – backing vocals
Gloria Williams – backing vocals on "I'll Have to Let Him Go"
Brian Holland – additional backing vocals on "A Love Like Yours (Don't Come Knocking Everyday)"
Raynoma Liles Gordy – organ on "I'll Have to Let Him Go"
Other instrumentation by the Funk Brothers: 
Joe Hunter – piano on "I'll Have to Let Him Go" and "Come and Get These Memories"
Earl Van Dyke – electric piano on "Come and Get These Memories"
James Jamerson – bass on "I'll Have to Let Him Go" and "Come and Get These Memories"
Benny Benjamin – drums on "I'll Have to Let Him Go" and "Come and Get These Memories" 
Eddie Willis – guitar on "I'll Have to Let Him Go" and "Come and Get these Memories"
Robert White – guitar on "Come and Get These Memories" 
Andrew "Mike" Terry – baritone saxophone on "I'll Have to Let Him Go" and "Come and Get These Memories"

References

1963 debut albums
Martha and the Vandellas albums
Gordy Records albums
Albums produced by William "Mickey" Stevenson
Albums produced by Brian Holland
Albums produced by Lamont Dozier
Albums recorded at Hitsville U.S.A.
Albums produced by Edward Holland Jr.